Capito is a genus of birds.

Capito may also refer to:

Capito (footballer) (born 1994), São Toméan footballer
Shelley Moore Capito (born 1953), U.S. Senator from West Virginia
Wolfgang Capito (or Köpfel) (1478–1541), German religious reformer
Gaius Ateius Capito (tribune), tribune of the people in 55 BCE
Gaius Ateius Capito (jurist), senator and jurist under Augustus and Tiberius
Gaius Fonteius Capito (disambiguation), a family of Roman consuls

See also
 Kapito